Fabien Schmidt (born 23 March 1989 in Colmar) is a French cyclist, who currently rides for French amateur team UC Briochine.

Major results

2011
 1st Paris–Tours Espoirs
 2nd Overall Tour de Gironde
 10th Grote Prijs Jef Scherens
2012
 3rd Overall Tour du Limousin
1st  Young rider classification
 5th Grand Prix des Marbriers
 7th Overall Mi-Août Bretonne
1st Stage 3
2013
 2nd Overall Rhône-Alpes Isère Tour
 6th La Roue Tourangelle
 9th Clásica de Almería
2014
 1st Stage 7 Tour de Bretagne
 7th Overall Tour du Loir-et-Cher
2017
 7th Overall Tour Alsace
2018
 1st  Overall Tour de Bretagne
2019
 1st  Mountains classification Boucles de la Mayenne

References

External links

1989 births
Living people
French male cyclists
Sportspeople from Colmar
Cyclists from Grand Est